Romain Poirot-Lellig (born in 1978) is a French entrepreneur, author, policy advisor and former diplomat. He is currently the Founder & CEO of Africa Delivery Technologies, the company behind a French/Nigerian mobility platform trading as Kwik Delivery.

A French entrepreneur in West Africa, he has past experience as a venture capital fundraiser, diplomat, policy advisor and author specialized in international affairs, public affairs and business development in Europe and Sub-Saharan Africa. He also taught international relations at Sciences Po Paris from 2010 to 2018.

Biography
Since 2018, Romain Poirot-Lellig has been the Founder & CEO of a French/Nigerian startup company named Africa Delivery Technologies and trading in Nigeria under the name Kwik Delivery.

From 2010 to 2018, Romain Poirot-Lellig worked as the lobbyist of French videogames company Ubisoft for France and the European Commission while working as a project finance consultant on energy projects.

From early 2008 to end of 2010, Romain Poirot-Lellig worked in Kabul, Afghanistan mostly as political advisor to two successive European Union Special Representatives. He worked briefly at the French Prime minister's Secretariat général de la défense nationale from 2007 to 2008 as NATO Desk Officer.

From 2005 to 2008, he was adviser for public policy to the President of Ubisoft Entertainment S.A. As such, he was instrumental, from the private sector side, in negotiating a digital production tax credit voted by French Parliament and approved by the European Commission.

From 2001, he working as a consultant providing financial advisory such as fundraising, business development and finance services to infrastructure, high-tech and media companies in Asia and Europe.

Prior to that, Romain Poirot-Lellig was a journalist for leading French newspapers, including La Tribune and Paris Match from 1996 to 2000.

He received a master's degree in International Affairs and international security from the Institut d’Etudes Politiques de Paris and a master's degree in Corporate Management from the Université Paris IX Dauphine.

He has been a co-founder and Executive Director of Association des Producteurs d’Oeuvres Multimédia (APOM, now SNJV), an interactive media trade group, from 2001 to 2005, as well as a Founder and Board Member of the EGDF, its European equivalent, from 2003 to 2005.

With former French ambassador in Afghanistan Jean d'Amécourt, he co-authored "Diplomate en guerre à Kaboul", a first-hand behind-the-scenes account of the pivotal years of the international coalition in Afghanistan published by Robert Laffont. The book was awarded the "Prix de la Légion d'Honneur" for 2013.

References

External links
 Romain Poirot-Lellig - Site perso
 Afghanistan : Retour sur les enjeux d'une guerre Op-Ed on the political end-game in Afghanistan - Rue89 - 09/01/2010
 Sarkozy recalé à l'examen d'aptitude en politique étrangère - Op-Ed on French foreign policy - Rue89 - 03/02/2011
 En Crimée, nous payons le prix de nos erreurs - Op-Ed on Crimea Crisis - Rue89 - 21/03/2014

 Romain Poirot-Lellig at MobyGames
 Romain Poirot-Lellig’s biography at Transmediale 05
 Romain Poirot-Lellig’s biography at IDATE 27th International Conference
 Diplomate en guerre à Kaboul on amazon.fr

Living people
1978 births